Great vessels are the large vessels that bring blood to and from the heart.  These are:

Superior vena cava
Inferior vena cava 
Pulmonary arteries
Pulmonary veins
Aorta

Transposition of the great vessels is a group of congenital heart defects involving an abnormal spatial arrangement of any of the great vessels.

References 

Angiology